Paul Francis Owens (February 7, 1924 – December 26, 2003), nicknamed "The Pope", was an American Major League Baseball (MLB) front office executive, manager, and scout. Earlier, during his playing career, Owens was a first baseman and catcher, and then a manager, in minor league baseball.

Philadelphia Phillies
Owens' entire Major League career was spent with the Philadelphia Phillies. In , he took the managerial reins of the Phillies in mid-season and led them to their fourth pennant, but lost to the Baltimore Orioles in the 1983 World Series.

Playing career
Nicknamed "The Pope" because of his resemblance to Pope Paul VI, Owens was born in Salamanca, New York, and attended St. Bonaventure University. He served in the United States Army during World War II. Prior to 1951, Owens spent several years in the semiprofessional ranks with the Salamanca Merchants in what was then the Suburban League, the local Town Team Baseball circuit.

Owens' professional playing career began in 1951 at the relatively advanced age of 27. He played exclusively at the lower ends of the minor leagues, with his active career largely centered in his native western New York. A first baseman who batted and threw right-handed, he twice (1951 and 1957) batted .407 with the Olean Oilers of the Class D PONY League (later called the New York–Penn League) and set a league record by hitting safely in 38 consecutive games in 1951. During his relatively brief playing career, Owens compiled a lifetime average of .374.

Managerial and front office career
In 1955, Owens was named Olean's playing manager; the following year, the Oilers became a Phillies' affiliate and Owens moved into their organization. In 1958 and 1959, he managed Class C Bakersfield of the California League. On June 3, 1972, he replaced John Quinn as the Phillies' general manager. Then, five weeks later, on July 10, Owens fired manager Frank Lucchesi and assumed that job as well, to get a closer (if temporary) look at the last-place Phillies' on-field struggles. He guided the Phillies to a 33–47 record for the remainder of the 1972 campaign.

After relinquishing managerial duties to Danny Ozark on November 7, 1972, he then returned to the front office and proceeded to turn the Phils into pennant contenders within three seasons. His farm system, one of the most productive in the game at the time, bore fruit—yielding players such as Mike Schmidt, Greg Luzinski, Bob Boone, Larry Bowa and Dick Ruthven. In addition, Owens aggressively swung trades to add missing pieces such as relief pitcher Tug McGraw and outfielders Garry Maddox and Bake McBride. The Phils won the NL East in ––—each time falling short in the National League Championship Series.

Owens thought he added the final piece in  when he signed free agent Pete Rose, but the Phils stumbled and finished fourth. In 1980, under manager Dallas Green, the Phillies beat Houston in an intense NLCS and then defeated the Kansas City Royals for the team's first world championship.

Owens assumed the managerial role for a second time on July 18, 1983 after firing Pat Corrales despite the Phillies having a 43–42 record and being tied for first place with the St. Louis Cardinals in the National League East. The Owens-led ballclub went from one game over .500 to 47 wins in its last 77 matches to clinch the division title. They then defeated the Los Angeles Dodgers in four games in the NLCS to win the Phillies' fourth pennant. During the World Series, the Phils lost to Baltimore in five games.

The Phillies played only .500 ball and finished fourth, 15½ games behind the division champ Chicago Cubs.

Owens was relieved of both his GM and managing jobs during the off-season, but remained with the Phillies as a senior advisor and special scout until his death, in 2003, at age 79 in Woodbury, New Jersey. For the 2004 season, the Phillies wore a patch on their right shoulder featuring a banner reading "Pope" in honor of Owens, and a shamrock in honor of former relief pitcher Tug McGraw, who had also died that winter.  His career managing record was 161–158 (.505).

Honors
Starting in 1986, the Phillies established the annual Paul Owens Award.  This award is given each season to both the top pitcher and the top position player within the Phillies' minor-league system.  In 1988, Owens was elected to the Philadelphia Baseball Wall of Fame (the first non-Phillies player elected and enshrined).  A plaque bearing his likeness is displayed in Ashburn Alley at Citizens Bank Park.

Footnotes

References
Johnson, Lloyd, ed., The Minor League Register. Durham, North Carolina: Baseball America, 1994.

External links

Obituary: "Paul Owens, 79; Shaped Champion Phillies", The New York Times, December 28, 2003.

1924 births
2003 deaths
Bakersfield Bears players
Baseball players from New York (state)
Major League Baseball executives
Major League Baseball farm directors
Major League Baseball general managers
Major League Baseball scouting directors
Olean Oilers players
Olean Oilers managers
People from Salamanca, New York
Philadelphia Phillies executives
Philadelphia Phillies managers
Philadelphia Phillies scouts
Sportspeople from Woodbury, New Jersey
United States Army personnel of World War II
Winston-Salem Cardinals players